The 2009 Armenian First League season began on 9 April 2009 and ended on 6 November 2009.

Overview 
 Impuls Dilijan returned to professional football.
 Shengavit represent the reserves of Ulisses FC.

League table

Top goalscorers

See also 
 2009 Armenian Premier League
 2009 Armenian Cup

Armenian First League seasons
2
Armenia
Armenia